The Tre Kronor class (English: Three Crowns class) was a class of two cruisers built for the Swedish Navy during World War II, comprising  and . Tre Kronor was discarded in 1968 and Göta Lejon was sold to Chile in 1971. Renamed Almirante Latorre, she remained in service until being discarded in 1986.

Design and development
The outbreak of World War II caused the Swedish Navy to change its naval strategy, with it being decided to base the fleet on two squadrons of destroyers, each of which would be led by a cruiser, instead of the existing organisation of slow coastal defence ships and small torpedo boats. In 1940, therefore, the Swedish government decided that two cruisers were to be built. The cruisers were designed by the Italian shipyard CRDA in 1940–1941.

The main armament was seven Bofors 152 mm guns, with one triple turret forward and two twin turrets aft. The guns were being built by Bofors for the s being built in the Netherlands for the Royal Netherlands Navy but were taken over by the Swedish government when the Netherlands surrendered to Germany in May 1940. Additional anti-aircraft armament was provided by 20 Bofors 40 mm guns in 10 twin turrets and seven 25 mm guns. Six  torpedo tubes were fitted, and the ship could also carry 160 mines.

A political debate broke out about the cruisers, with this, together with rework of the design, ensured that work did not start until 1943.

Service history
The delayed start to the ships and industrial action meant that World War II was long over when the ships were completed, with both ships entering service in 1947. They were refitted in the late 1940s and early 1950s, with a new bridge fitted, radar added and the 25 mm guns replaced by seven more 40 mm Bofors guns.

Göta Lejon had another major refit between 1957 and 1958, with new radar being fitted, and a revised secondary anti-aircraft armament of four Bofors 57 mm guns and eleven 40 mm Bofors guns. A similar upgrade for Tre Kronor was cancelled due to lack of funds.

Tre Kronor went into reserve in 1958, was stricken on 1 January 1964 and sold for scrap in 1968, being used to build a pontoon bridge. The more modern Göta Lejon was not stricken until 1 July 1970, and was sold to Chile in July 1971, being commissioned into the Chilean Navy as Almirante Latorre on 18 September 1971. Latorre was stricken from the Chilean Navy in 1984, and was sold in August 1986, being scrapped in Taiwan in 1987.

Ships

Notes

References
 Friedman, Norman. The Naval Institute Guide to World Naval Weapon Systems 1997–1998. Annapolis, Maryland, USA: Naval Institute Press, 1997. .
 Gardiner, Robert and Roger Chesneau. Conway's All The World's Fighting Ships 1922–1946. London: Conway Maritime Press 1980. .
 Gardiner, Robert and Stephen Chumbley. Conway's All The World's Fighting Ships 1947–1995. Annapolis, Maryland USA: Naval Institute Press, 1995. .
 Moore, John. Jane's Fighting Ships 1985–86. London: Jane's Yearbooks, 1985. .
 Whitley, M.J. Cruisers of World War Two: An International Encyclopedia. London: Brockhampton Press, 1999. .

Cruiser classes